Robert D. Watson is a keyboardist, record producer and composer. He is best known for his work with the rock bands Daniel Amos and The Swirling Eddies (credited as Arthur Fhardy). Watson has many projects to his credit, including his album Great Hymns of the Faith, released in 1996.

References

Living people
American keyboardists
American record producers
American audio engineers
20th-century American composers
21st-century American composers
American male composers
The Swirling Eddies members
Daniel Amos members
20th-century American male musicians
21st-century American male musicians
Year of birth missing (living people)